Moorabbin Transit was a bus operator in Melbourne, Australia. As a Melbourne bus company, it operated 11 bus routes under contract to the Government of Victoria.  A subsidiary of Grenda Corporation, it was purchased by Ventura Bus Lines in January 2012.

History
Moorabbin Transit was formed in July 1988 when Grenda Corporation purchased Blue & Silver Bus Lines, Camden Bus Lines, Hampton Green, Hampton Red, and Southland Bus Service. Sandringham Bus Co was added in December 1988.

Moorabbin Transit was included in the sale of Grenda Corporation to Ventura Bus Lines in November 2011 and the brand was retired.

Fleet
As at March 2014 the fleet consists of 83 buses. Moorabbin Transit original livery was the cream and three stripes of Grenda's Bus Services, but with the red stripes painted green. It has since adopted the standard white with red and yellow flashes of Grenda Corporation.

See also
Buses in Melbourne
List of Victorian Bus Companies
List of Melbourne bus routes

References

External links
Public Transport Victoria timetables

Bus companies of Victoria (Australia)
Bus transport in Melbourne
Transport companies established in 1988
Australian companies established in 1988